Armored Car is an overhead view maze arcade game released by Stern Electronics in 1981. The player drives an armored car as the maze scrolls from right to left, collecting money, and avoiding criminals.

Gameplay

References

External links
 Armored Car at Arcade History
 

1981 video games
Arcade video games
Arcade-only video games
Maze games
Stern video games
Video games developed in the United States